The Amarillo Open was a golf tournament on the Ben Hogan Tour. It was only played in 1990. It was played in at the Amarillo Country Club in Amarillo, Texas.

Lindy Miller, playing in his first Ben Hogan Tour event, won by two strokes over four other golfers. He received $20,000 for winning the event.

Winners

See also
Amarillo Ladies' Open, LPGA Tour event at same course in 1966–67

References

Former Korn Ferry Tour events
Golf in Texas
Sports in Amarillo, Texas
1990 in sports in Texas
1990 establishments in Texas
1990 disestablishments in Texas